End Over End was an American rock music group band from Dallas, Texas. Formed in 1984 as The End, they disbanded in 1991. From 1985 to 1990, End Over End was one of a triumvirate of highly successful local bands who often appeared together in the Dallas Deep Ellum / Fort-Worth area alternative-rock clubs, the other two being Shallow Reign and Three On A Hill. Singer/guitarist Tench Coxe later played as part of Three On a Hill, and Bedhead (Trance Syndicate).  End Over End was the first local band to perform at famed Dallas venue Theater Gallery in November 1984.

Band members
Tench Coxe - Vocals, Guitar
Tad Looney - (1988–1991) - Vocals, Guitar
Kevin Moore - Bass Guitar
David Mabry - Drums

Discography

Seven Day Servant- Single released 1985 on Pool records.
Scenes From a New World- LP released 1987 on Deep Ellum records.

American new wave musical groups
American post-punk music groups
Musical groups established in 1984
Musical groups disestablished in 1990
1984 establishments in the United States
1990 disestablishments in Texas
Musical groups from Dallas